Świecie is a village in the administrative district of Gmina Leśna, within Lubań County, Lower Silesian Voivodeship, in south-western Poland, near the border with the Czech Republic.

Geography

From 1975 to 1998, Świecie was part of Jelenia Góra Voivodeship.

History
Świecie Castle, situated on a Gneiss rock, was first mentioned in a 1329 treaty between King John of Bohemia, who had been enfeoffed with the Upper Lusatian estates by Emperor Louis IV, and Duke Henry I of Jawor, ruler over the adjacent Lower Silesian lands in the east. The fortress, together with the neighbouring castles at Leśna and Czocha were finally incorporated into the Lands of the Bohemian Crown in 1346.

According to the 1635 Peace of Prague, Świecie passed to the Electorate of Saxony. In 1719 the estates were purchased by the Saxon field marshal Jacob Heinrich von Flemming. Upon the Vienna Congress in 1815, the area was incorporated into the Prussian Province of Silesia.

References

External links

Świecie Castle 

Villages in Lubań County